Siow Lee Chan is a former Malaysian Paralympic powerlifting. She won bronze at the 2008 Summer Paralympics in Beijing. She is also the first Malaysian female paralympian to ever win a medal at the Paralympics.

References

External links 
 

Living people
Year of birth missing (living people)
Malaysian people of Chinese descent
Malaysian powerlifters
Paralympic powerlifters of Malaysia
Paralympic bronze medalists for Malaysia
Powerlifters at the 2008 Summer Paralympics
Medalists at the 2008 Summer Paralympics
Paralympic medalists in powerlifting
21st-century Malaysian women